Frank Nervik (21 June 1934 – 12 January 2020) was a Norwegian football goalkeeper.

He grew up in Øya, Trondheim, and spent his career in SK Brage except for a tenure in Fredrikstad FK. In his older days he was a central member of Sjetne IL. In 1959 he was capped once for Norway and twice for Norway B.

References

External links
 

1934 births
2020 deaths
Footballers from Trondheim
Norwegian footballers
Fredrikstad FK players
Norway international footballers
Association football goalkeepers